A T and O map or O–T or T–O map (orbis terrarum, orb or circle of the lands; with the letter T inside an O), also known as an Isidoran map, is a type of early world map that represents the physical world as first described by the 7th-century scholar Isidore of Seville in his De Natura Rerum and later his Etymologiae.

Although not included in the original Isidorian maps, a later manuscript added the names of Noah's sons (Sem, Iafeth and Cham) for each of the three continents (see Biblical terminology for race).

More detailed later maps with equivalent orientation are sometimes described as a "Beatine map" after the Beatus map because one of the earliest known representations of this sort is attributed to Beatus of Liébana, an 8th-century Spanish monk, in the prologue to his Commentary on the Apocalypse.

Isidore's description
De Natura Rerum, Chapter XLVIII, 2 (translation):

Etymologiae, chapter 14, de terra et partibus:

Etymologiae, chapter 14, de terra et partibus (translation):

History and description
Although Isidore taught in the Etymologiae that the Earth was "round", his meaning was ambiguous and some writers think he referred to a disc-shaped Earth. However, other writings by Isidore make it clear that he considered the Earth to be globular. Indeed, the theory of a spherical Earth had always been the prevailing assumption among the learned since at least Aristotle, who had divided the spherical earth into zones of climate, with a frigid clime at the poles, a deadly torrid clime near the equator, and a mild and habitable temperate clime between the two.

The T and O map represents only the one half of the spherical Earth. It was presumably considered a convenient projection of known-inhabited parts, the northern temperate half of the globe. It was then believed that no one could cross the torrid equatorial clime and reach the unknown lands on the other half of the globe. These imagined lands were called antipodes.

The T is the Mediterranean, the Nile, and the Don (formerly called the Tanais) dividing the three continents, Asia, Europe and Africa, and the O is the encircling ocean. Jerusalem was generally represented in the center of the map. Asia was typically the size of the other two continents combined. Because the Sun rose in the east, Paradise (the Garden of Eden) was generally depicted as being in Asia, and Asia was situated at the top portion of the map.

This qualitative and conceptual type of medieval cartography could yield extremely detailed maps in addition to simple representations. The earliest maps had only a few cities and the most important bodies of water noted.  The four sacred rivers of the Holy Land were always present.  More useful tools for the traveler were the itinerarium, which listed in order the names of towns between two points, and the periplus that did the same for harbors and landmarks along a seacoast. Later maps of this same conceptual format featured many rivers and cities of Eastern as well as Western Europe, and other features encountered during the Crusades.  Decorative illustrations were also added in addition to the new geographic features.  The most important cities would be represented by distinct fortifications and towers in addition to their names, and the empty spaces would be filled with mythical creatures.

Gallery

See also
 Flat Earth
 Mappa Mundi
 Babylonian Map of the World

References

Further reading
 Christoph Mauntel, ‘The T-O Diagram and its Religious Connotations – a Circumstantial Case’, in Christoph Mauntel (ed.), Geography and Religious Knowledge in the Medieval World, Berlin/Boston, deGruyter, 2021, pp. 57-82. 

 Carlo Zaccagnini, ‘Maps of the World’, in Giovanni B. Lanfranchi et al., Leggo!  Studies Presented to Frederick Mario Fales on the occasion of his 65th birthday, Wiesbaden, Harrassowitz Verlag, 2012, pp. 865–874. 

 Brigitte Englisch, Ordo orbis terrae. Die Weltsicht in den Mappae mundi des frühen und hohen Mittelalters. Berlin 2002, 
 

8th-century works
Map types